The 2022 Syed Modi International (officially known as the Syed Modi India International) was a badminton tournament that took place at the Babu Banarasi Das Indoor Stadium in Lucknow, Uttar Pradesh, India, from 18 to 23 January 2022. It had a total prize pool of US$150,000.

The men's singles title was not awarded, a first in the tournament's and the sport's history, due to both finalists – both French – contracted with COVID-19.

Tournament
The 2022 Syed Modi International was the second tournament of the 2022 BWF World Tour and was part of the Syed Modi International Badminton Championships, which had been held since 1991. The tournament was organized by the Badminton Association of India with sanction from the Badminton World Federation.

Venue
This international tournament was held at the Babu Banarasi Das Indoor Stadium at Gomti Nagar, Lucknow, Uttar Pradesh, India.

Point distribution 
Below is the point distribution table for each phase of the tournament based on the BWF points system for the BWF World Tour Super 300 event.

Prize money 
The total prize money for this tournament was US$150,000. The distribution of the prize money was in accordance with BWF regulations.

Men's singles

Seeds 

 Srikanth Kidambi (withdrew)
 Lakshya Sen (withdrew)
 B. Sai Praneeth (withdrew)
 Sameer Verma (first round)
 Prannoy Kumar (quarter-finals)
 Parupalli Kashyap (withdrew)
 Sourabh Verma (first round)
 Brian Yang (withdrew)

Finals

Top half

Section 1

Section 2

Bottom half

Section 3

Section 4

Women's singles

Seeds 

 P. V. Sindhu (champion)
 Michelle Li (withdrew) 
 Yeo Jia Min  (withdrew)
 Saina Nehwal (withdrew)
 Evgeniya Kosetskaya (semi-finals)
 Supanida Katethong (quarter-finals)
 Iris Wang (withdrew)
 Jordan Hart (withdrew)

Finals

Top half

Section 1

Section 2

Bottom half

Section 3

Section 4

Men's doubles

Seeds 

 Satwiksairaj Rankireddy / Chirag Shetty (withdrew)
 Vladimir Ivanov / Ivan Sozonov (quarter-finals)
 B. Sumeeth Reddy / Manu Attri (withdrew)
 Arjun M.R. / Dhruv Kapila (semi-finals)
 Tan Kian Meng / Tan Wee Kiong (withdrew)
 Vishnu Vardhan Goud Panjala / Krishna Prasad Garaga (final)
 Fabien Delrue / William Villeger (quarter-finals)
 Man Wei Chong / Tee Kai Wun (champions)

Finals

Top half

Section 1

Section 2

Bottom half

Section 3

Section 4

Women's doubles

Seeds 

 Ashwini Ponnappa / N. Sikki Reddy (withdrew)
 Anastasiia Akchurina / Olga Morozova (quarter-finals)
 Benyapa Aimsaard / Nuntakarn Aimsaard (withdrew)
 K. Ashwini Bhat / Shikha Gautam (withdrew)
 Vivian Hoo / Lim Chiew Sien (quarter-finals)
 Anne Tran / Margot Lambert (withdrew)
 Gayathri Gopichand / Treesa Jolly (final)
 Anna Cheong / Teoh Mei Xing (champions)

Finals

Top half

Section 1

Section 2

Bottom half

Section 3

Section 4

Mixed doubles

Seeds 

 Rodion Alimov / Alina Davletova (withdrew)
 Chen Tang Jie / Peck Yen Wei (quarter-finals)
 Callum Hemming / Jessica Pugh (withdrew)
 Venkat Gaurav Prasad / Juhi Dewangan (second round)
 Chan Peng Soon / Valeree Siow (second round)
 Dhruv Kapila / N. Sikki Reddy (withdrew)
 Ishaan Bhatnagar / Tanisha Crasto (champions)
 William Villeger / Anne Tran (quarter-finals)

Finals

Top half

Section 1

Section 2

Bottom half

Section 3

Section 4

References

External links
 Tournament Link

Syed Modi International Badminton Championships
Syed Modi International
Syed Modi International
Syed Modi International